Randolph Collier (July 26, 1902 – August 2, 1983) was a member of the California State Senate.  He was Senator from the Second District from 1939 to 1967, and from the First District from 1967 to 1976. Initially a member of the Republican Party, he moved to the Democratic Party in 1959.

Collier served as chairman of the California Senate Transportation Committee and was the sponsor and co-author of the Collier–Burns Highway Act of 1947, which established the California transportation infrastructure. He was chairman of the Senate Interim Committee on Highways, Streets and Bridges. Collier was an opponent of rapid transit. A rest stop in Siskiyou County, where he lived nearly all of his life, is named after him, as is a tunnel on the Redwood Highway, U.S. Route 199.

In 1976, Collier was defeated for re-election by former state Assemblyman Ray E. Johnson and moved to Sacramento, where he spent the remainder of his life until dying of chronic pulmonary obstruction at the age of 81.

References

1902 births
1983 deaths
Place of birth missing
Place of death missing
California state senators
California Republicans
California Democrats
People from Siskiyou County, California
20th-century American politicians
University of California, Berkeley alumni